Natalie Plain  is an American business woman, author, producer and a former White House intern. She is the founder and CEO of Billion Dollar Beauty, an American beauty brand under which she has invented a tool called the Brow Buddy, and is a former Hollywood television writer and producer.

Career
After graduating in 1995, Plain secured an internship at the White House under President Bill Clinton and alongside Monica Lewinsky. Her original goal was to become a White House correspondent for NBC News, but after her return to California she started working on the television series REAL TV. 

After producing a feature on a celebrity eyebrow artist, in 2004 Plain launched Billion Dollar Beauty out of her Los Angeles apartment, using credit cards to fund her venture while continuing her day job as a television producer.

In 2015 she was a finalist for the U.S. Small Business Administration's Small Business Person of the Year Award.

References

External links
Billion Dollar Beauty

1973 births
Living people
20th-century American women
21st-century American women
American fashion businesspeople
American television producers
American women television producers
White House staff